The 2017 Sultan of Johor Cup was the seventh edition of the Sultan of Johor Cup, a field hockey tournament. It was held in Johor Bahru, Johor, Malaysia from 22 to 29 October 2017.

As in previous editions, a total of six teams competed for the title. England, New Zealand as well as Pakistan who competed previously, were absent from the tournament. The teams were replaced by Great Britain, India and United States.

Participating nations
Including the host nation, 6 teams competed in the tournament.

 (host nation)

Umpires
A total of seven umpires were appointed by the FIH and National Association to officiate the tournament.

 Tim Bond (NZL)
 Anand Dangi (IND)
 Ian Diamond (GBR)
 Ben Hocking (AUS)
 Faqarudin Kadir (MAS)
 Kinoshita Hideki (JPN)
 Benjamin Peters (USA)

Results
The schedule was released on 7 September 2017.
All times are in Malaysia Standard Time (UTC+08:00).

Pool matches

Classification matches

Fifth and sixth place

Third and fourth place

Final

Awards
Five awards were awarded at the conclusion of the tournament.

Final standings

Goalscorers

References

External links
Official website

Sultan of Johor Cup
Sultan of Johor Cup
Sultan of Johor Cup
Sultan of Johor Cup